Jan Hendrik Albert "Henny" Eman (born 20 March 1948) is an Aruban retired politician. He was the first Prime Minister of Aruba from 1 January 1986 to 9 February 1989 and again from 29 July 1994 to 30 October 2001.

Introduction 

Jan Hendrik Albert Eman, simply known as Henny, was born on Aruba on 20 March 1948. His grandfather (also known as Henny Eman) founded the Christian Democratic Party Aruban People's Party (AVP) and is considered pioneer of Aruba's political "Seperacion" from the Netherlands Antilles.

His mother was Jewish and his father was Protestant. His father, Albert Eman, better known as Shon A Eman, carried on the AVP's leadership banner. Shon A dedicated his life to Aruba's quest for a "Separate Status within the Kingdom" as presented to Holland during the Round Table Conference of the Kingdom of the Netherlands in 1948 at The Hague (Henny was born two days later).

Henny grew up in a political environment. At an early age he went to the Netherlands. As a high school graduate he became a student at the Leiden University's Law School. Upon the unexpected early death of his father, Henny Eman, was forced to undertake some business activities in Leiden in addition to his studies.

Revival of the AVP 

In 1977 the AVP was confronted with serious opposition and was struggling for survival with only one seat in the Insular Parliament. Henny Eman interrupted his studies to tend a helping hand to the party. His relatively brief stay in Aruba became decisive for his future career: politics. In 1978 he obtained his law degree. He presented his thesis dealing with the historical and judicial aspects of Aruba's Status aparte.

Three months before April 1979 elections Henny Eman arrived in Aruba. He became leader of the remains of Aruba's only political party still holding on to Status Aparte. The AVP was reinforced with young and capable people running for office as did Henny Eman. The 1979 elections outcome turned the tide for the AVP party that obtained four seats in Parliament.

After an absence of six years the AVP also made its re-entrance into Federal Parliament during 1979. Henny Eman became a well-respected member of the Antillean Parliament as well as the Insular Parliament of Aruba. In 1986 he became the first Prime Minister of the newborn country Aruba then besieged by the crisis resulting from LAGO's departure. The Eman administration executed a well prepared economic rescue plan and within a couple of years Aruba was once again afloat sailing in waters of prosperity. During his term the two main political parties – the Arubaanse Volkspartij (AVP, Aruban Peoples Party) led by Eman and the Movimiento Electoral di Pueblo (MEP, People's Electoral Movement) led by Nelson Oduber – accused each other of permitting the Cuntrera-Caruana Mafia clan to infest Aruba with narcotraphic and both claim to have kicked them off the island.

The party's growth in 1989 elections did not permit Henny Eman's return to office. He accepted a seat in the opposition bench of Parliament.

Honours 

Henny Eman was awarded with the Order of Francisco de Miranda (Orden Francisco de Miranda) and Order of the Liberator (Orden del Libertador) by the Government of Venezuela and made an Officer of the Order of the Netherlands Lion (Officier in de orde van de Nederlandse Leeuw) by the Government of the Netherlands.

References

1948 births
Aruban People's Party politicians
Living people
Members of the Estates of Aruba
Prime Ministers of Aruba